Beatty Creek is a stream in  Thurston County in the U.S. state of Washington. It is a tributary of McLane Creek.

Beatty Creek has the name of Daniel C. Beatty, a pioneer settler.

References

Rivers of Thurston County, Washington
Rivers of Washington (state)